Ken Brown is a former center in the National Football League.

Biography
Brown was born Kenneth Eugene Brown on April 19, 1954, in Saginaw, Michigan. He now lives in Minnesota.

Career
Brown played with the Denver Broncos during the 1979 NFL season. The following season, he was a member of the Green Bay Packers.

He played at the collegiate level at the University of New Mexico.

See also
List of Green Bay Packers players

References

1954 births
Living people
Sportspeople from Saginaw, Michigan
Denver Broncos players
Green Bay Packers players
American football centers
University of New Mexico alumni
New Mexico Lobos football players